Year's Best SF 5 is a science fiction anthology edited by David G. Hartwell that was published in 2000.  It is the fifth in the Year's Best SF series.

Contents

The book itself, as well as each of the stories, has a short
introduction by the editor.

Geoff Ryman: "Everywhere" (First published in Interzone, 1999)
 Elisabeth Malartre: "Evolution Never Sleeps" (First published in Asimov's, 1998)
Kim Stanley Robinson: "Sexual Dimorphism" (First published in The Martians, 1999)
Robert Reed: "Game of the Century" (First published in F&SF, 1999)
Michael Bishop: "Secrets of the Alien Reliquary" (First published in Time Pieces, 1998)
Sarah Zettel: "Kinds of Strangers" (First published in Analog, 1999)
Cory Doctorow: "Visit the Sins" (First published in Asimov's,1999)
Greg Egan: "Border Guards" (First published in Interzone, 1999)
Terry Bisson: "Macs" (First published in F&SF, 1999)
Chris Lawson: "Written in Blood" (First published in Asimov's, 1999)
Gene Wolfe: "Has Anybody Seen Junie Moon?" (First published in Moon Shots, 1999)
Robert J. Sawyer: "The Blue Planet" (First published as "Mars Reacts!" in The Globe and Mail, 1999)
Mary Soon Lee: "Lifework" (First published in Interzone, 1999)
 Fred Lerner: "Rosetta Stone" (First published in Artemis, 2000)
Brian Aldiss: "An Apollo Asteroid" (First published in Moon Shots, 1999)
 Curt Wohleber: "100 Candles" (First published in Transversions, 1999)
G. David Nordley: "Democritus' Violin" (First published in Analog, 1999)
Tom Purdom: "Fossil Games" (First published in Asimov's, 1999)
Chris Beckett: "Valour" (First published in Interzone, 1999)
Stephen Baxter: "Huddle" (First published in F&SF, 1999)
Brian M. Stableford: "Ashes and Tombstones" (First published in Moon Shots, 1999)
Michael Swanwick: "Ancient Engines" (First published in Asimov's, 1999)
Hiroe Suga: "Freckled Figure" (First published in Japanese in 1994, first English publication in Interzone, 1999)
Barry N. Malzberg: "Shiva" (First published in Science Fiction Age, 1999)
Lucy Sussex: "The Queen of Erewhon" (First published in F&SF, 1999)

External links 

2000 anthologies
Year's Best SF anthology series
Eos Books books
2000s science fiction works